Reichlingia zwackhii is a species of corticolous (bark-dwelling) lichen in the family Arthoniaceae. It was first formally described by German lichenologist Johann Heinrich Sandstede in 1903, as a member of genus Arthonia. Andreas Frisch and Göran Thor transferred it to the genus Reichlingia in 2013. The lichen occurs in temperate regions of Europe. Peter Wilfred James proposed the variety Arthonia zwackhii var. macrospora in 1978, on the basis of specimens collected from Britain that had consistently larger ascospores and different lichen products. This taxon is now known as a distinct species, Synarthonia astroidestera.

References

Arthoniaceae
Lichen species
Lichens described in 1903
Lichens of Europe